Ptolemy Apion or simply known as Apion (between 150 BC and 145 BC – 96 BC) was the last Greek King of Cyrenaica who separated it from the Ptolemaic Kingdom of Egypt, and in his last will bequeathed his country to Rome. He was a member of the Ptolemaic dynasty.

Biography
Ptolemy was the son of the Greek prince, King of Cyrene and future Pharaoh of Egypt Ptolemy VIII Physcon and his third wife, Eirene (Irene). Ptolemy's paternal uncle was the Pharaoh Ptolemy VI Philometor and his paternal aunt was the princess and queen Cleopatra II of Egypt. His paternal grandparents were Pharaoh Ptolemy V Epiphanes and Queen Cleopatra I of Egypt, who was one the Greek princesses of the Seleucid Empire.

Ptolemy's mother, Eirene (Irene), may actually have been named Ithaca, according to the Roman Jewish historian Josephus. Little is known of Eirene's origins, apart from the fact she came from Cyrenaica. She was a mistress of Physcon's and was among his concubines. Eirene served as Physcon's mistress from 150 BC til 127 BC. Eirene accompanied Physcon in 145 BC to Egypt when he became pharaoh and succeeded his brother Ptolemy VI.

Ptolemy was most probably born in Cyrene, the capital of Cyrenaica, but was raised and educated in his father's court in Egypt.  Until 116 BC, he most probably lived in Egypt. Ptolemy never held a royal Egyptian title. In 116 BC, Ptolemy's father had died. From Physcon's will, Ptolemy inherited Cyrenaica and, in that year, ascended the throne without any political opposition.

Little is recorded of Ptolemy's reign of Cyrenaica. Ptolemy died in 96 BC and he implemented the terms of his father's will for Cyrenaica. He never married and had no heirs. In Ptolemy's will, he left Cyrenaica and his ancestral royal estates to the rule of the Roman Republic. Physcon had planned this for Cyrenaica after Ptolemy's death.

Ptolemy's ancestral estates were occupied by locals in the 1st century. The occupiers of the estates needed assistance from the Roman emperor Nero, to legalise the land title through their occupations, thereby vesting ownership in them.

References

Tacitus - Annals of Imperial Rome, Nero and his Helpers (xiv. 14–65)

External links
 

Kings of Cyrene
Ptolemaic dynasty
2nd-century BC births
96 BC deaths
Year of birth unknown
2nd-century BC Greek people
1st-century BC Greek people